Mary Randolph Carter is an American author, photographer, and collector. She was formerly the creative director for Ralph Lauren in New York City. She is known for writing about the aesthetic of homely clutter.

Personal life 
She is married to advertiser Howard Berg.

Books 
American Junk  and 
Garden Junk   and 
Kitchen Junk  and 
Big City Junk  and 
The Joy of Junk  and

References

External links 
 Home page

American writers
Living people
Year of birth missing (living people)